Dettifoss is a waterfall in Vatnajökull National Park in Northeast Iceland, and is reputed to be the second most powerful waterfall in Europe after the Rhine Falls. Dettifoss is situated on the Jökulsá á Fjöllum river, which flows from the Vatnajökull glacier and collects water from a large area in Northeast Iceland. The sediment-rich runoff colours the water a greyish white.

It is the second largest waterfall in Iceland in terms of volume discharge (behind the Urriðafoss), having an average water flow of 193 m³/s. The superlative of "most powerful" comes from its water flow times its fall distance.

Tourist access
Dettifoss is served on its west side by Route 862, a tarmac road built in 2011. Road 862 gives access to Dettifoss in all seasons more and less, while an older gravel road (Route 864) serves the east side and is usually passable in summer only.

On the west bank there are minimal facilities, including a pit toilet, maintained hiking path and a view-platform. On the east bank there is an information panel maintained by the staff of Vatnajökull National Park, a public toilet, and a trail to the waterfall.

Dettifoss is located on the Diamond Circle, a popular tourist route around Húsavík and Lake Mývatn in North Iceland.

In media
The musical composition "Dettifoss" (Op. 57) by Jón Leifs is inspired by this waterfall.

The waterfall is featured in the 2012 science-fiction film Prometheus, standing in as landscape on a primordial Earth-like planet.

See also 
 List of waterfalls
 Waterfalls of Iceland

References

Leffman, David; and Proctor, James (2004). The Rough Guide To Iceland, Rough Guides, 281. .

External links

Dettifoss on Flickr
Dettifoss on World of Waterfalls
Dettifoss on YouTube

Waterfalls of Iceland
North Volcanic Zone of Iceland